Crawfordsville is a ghost town in Crawford County, Illinois, United States. The townsite lies on both sides of the dividing line between Honey Creek Township and Montgomery Township.

References

Geography of Crawford County, Illinois
Ghost towns in Illinois